Dame Lesley Howard Rees DBE (born 17 November 1942) is a British professor, medical doctor, and endocrinologist. She was Dean of St Bartholomew's Hospital Medical College (Bart’s) from 1989–95, the first and only woman to hold this post. Rees led the College to a successful merger with the London Hospital Medical College as part of Queen Mary University of London in 1995. She is currently Emeritus Professor of Chemical Endocrinology at Bart's.

Rees was educated at Pate's Grammar School for Girls, Cheltenham. Rees studied at Bart’s and qualified in 1965. She went on to specialise in clinical endocrinology and was appointed Professor of Chemical Endocrinology in 1980. She also became the University of London's public orator, the first science graduate to hold this post. She has published more than 300 articles in peer-reviewed journals, and in 1980 delivered the Goulstonian lecture of the Royal College of Physicians.

In 1984 Rees became the first woman to serve as chairman of the UK Society for Endocrinology and was awarded its Jubilee Medal in 1989. She was chair of the editorial board of the society's academic journal Clinical Endocrinology for 10 years until 2010. Rees also served as Secretary General of the International Society of Endocrinology, the first time the post was held outside the USA.

In 1983, as subdean at Bart’s, Rees "was given" the task of reforming medical education. An innovative development was the building of a Clinical Skills Laboratory for medical students, nursing and midwifery training. This was modelled on a laboratory at the University of Limburg in Maastricht which had been shown to raise the performance of clinical skills in medical students.

Rees became the first Director of Education at the Royal College of Physicians in 1997. In 2001, Rees was awarded a DBE for services to medical education.

She is a niece of the conductor, Sir Colin Davis.

References

1942 births
Living people
British endocrinologists
Women endocrinologists
British university and college faculty deans
Women deans (academic)
20th-century English medical doctors
Dames Commander of the Order of the British Empire
People educated at Pate's Grammar School